Sainte-Rosalie is a former town in Quebec, Canada which was annexed to the town of Saint-Hyacinthe in 2002.

See also
 2000–06 municipal reorganization in Quebec

External links
 Fondation du patrimoine religieux du Québec - Inventaire des lieux de culte du Québec – Église Sainte-Rosalie

Communities in Montérégie
Former municipalities in Quebec
Saint-Hyacinthe
Populated places disestablished in 2002